The NHL Foundation Player Award was awarded annually to the National Hockey League (NHL) player "who applies the core values of (ice) hockey—commitment, perseverance and teamwork—to enrich the lives of people in his community". The winner is given a grant of US$ 25,000 to help causes that the winner supports. Many players have been awarded as a result of large charitable contributions to their community. For instance, Vincent Lecavalier received the award in 2008 for committing US $3 million to build The Vincent Lecavalier Pediatric Cancer and Blood Disorder Center at All Children’s Hospital in St. Petersburg, Florida.

Fifteen players won the NHL Foundation Player Award during its existence. No player has ever won the award twice. The Buffalo Sabres, Calgary Flames and the Detroit Red Wings are the only teams to have been represented twice by winners. The award is closely related to the King Clancy Memorial Trophy, as both are awarded to a player who has made a significant humanitarian contribution to his community. German Olaf Kolzig, Swede Henrik Zetterberg and Americans Ryan Miller and Dustin Brown are the only non-Canadian winners, while Ron Francis and Joe Sakic are the only winners to have been elected into the Hockey Hall of Fame.

The award was discontinued for the 2017–18 NHL season, with the associated charitable donation being redirected towards the King Clancy Memorial Trophy.

Winners

Notes
 No award was presented due to the 2004–05 NHL lockout.
 Denotes joint winners

References 
General

Specific

National Hockey League trophies and awards